Peter R. Biondo (December 21, 1916 – May 16, 1997) was an American politician who served in the New York State Assembly from 1966 to 1974.

References

1916 births
1997 deaths
Politicians from Kingston, New York
Republican Party members of the New York State Assembly
20th-century American politicians